Uriah Rennie (born 23 October 1959 in Sheffield, England) is a retired top level English football referee.

He was the first black referee to officiate in games of the Premier League.

Career
Rennie began refereeing in 1979 in local leagues, then operated in the Northern Premier League until 1994, at which time he was appointed to the Football League List of referees. He was given his first Premiership appointment on 23 August 1997, a game between Leeds United and Crystal Palace at Elland Road. Rennie became a FIFA referee in 2000, and joined the Select Group of professional referees the following year. Keith Hackett, head of the Professional Game Match Officials Board has described him as "the fittest referee we have ever seen on the national and world scene." At the end of 2004, he retired from the FIFA list, after reaching the compulsory age of 45 but made a return to active refereeing in November 2007. In September 2010, Rennie became president of Hallam FC which was celebrating its 150th anniversary season.

Career statistics

(There are no available records prior to 1997/1998)

Life outside football
He practises both kick-boxing and aikido, and has a Master's degree in business administration and law. He is also a magistrate in Sheffield. He is married and has one daughter and a son. He appeared as himself in the BBC Two drama Marvellous, broadcast in September 2014.

In August 2015, he became the referee in the ITV game show, Freeze Out, presented by Mark Durden-Smith.

References

External links

Uriah Rennie Referee Statistics at soccerbase.com

1959 births
Living people
Sportspeople from Sheffield
English football referees
English Football League referees
Premier League referees
Black British sportspeople